The following is a timeline of the history of the city of Bergen, Norway.

Prior to 19th century

 1070s CE - Bergen founded by Olaf Kyrre (approximate date).
 1080 - Catholic diocese of Bergen established (approximate date).
 1153 - Bergen Cathedral School founded.
 1163 - Coronation of Magnus V of Norway.
 1180 - St Mary's Church, Bergen built (approximate date).
 1181
  occurs.
 First recorded historical reference to Bergen Cathedral.
 1194 - 29 June: Coronation of Sverre of Norway.
 1247 - 29 July: Coronation of Haakon IV of Norway.
 1261
 11 September: Magnus-Ingeborg wedding party takes place in Haakon's Hall.
 14 September: Coronation of Magnus VI of Norway.
 1280 - Coronation of Eric II of Norway.
 1350s - Hanseatic merchants set up kontor in Bryggen.
 1393 - Sacking of Bergen (1393).
 1429 -  occurs.
 1531 - Christ Church, Bergen demolished.
 1665 - 2 August: Naval Battle of Vågen occurs.
 1684 - Birth of Ludvig Holberg, writer and poet.
 1702 - Fire.
 1721 - Peter Nørvig printer in business.
 1769 - Population: 18,827.
 1764 - End of membership of the Hanseatic League.
 1794 - Foundation of the local branch of the theatrical society Det Dramatiske Selskab.
 Birgithe Kühle publishes the magazine Provincial-Lecture.

19th century
 1800 - The first theater, Komediehuset på Engen, is built. 
 1807 - Birth of Johan Sebastian Welhaven, "one of the greatest figures in Norwegian literature".
 1825 - Bergen Museum founded.
 1837 -  becomes mayor.
 1838 -  founded.
 1843 - Birth of Edvard Grieg, future composer and pianist.
 1850 - Det norske Theater (Bergen) opens.
 1851 - Bergen Steamship Company in business.
 1853 - Stølen School established.
 1855
 Fire.
 Bergens Privatbank and Bergen Mekaniske Verksted (shipyard) established.
 1867 -  (prison) built.
 1868
 Bergens Tidende (newspaper) begins publication.
  (monument) erected.
 1872 - Hanseatic Museum established.
 1873 - Causative agent of leprosy, the bacterium Mycobacterium leprae, identified by Gerhard Henrik Armauer Hansen.
 1875 - Population: 54,436.
 1876 - Bergens Kreditbank established.
 1882
  (phone company) begins operating.
  ("moral protection" group) founded.
 1883 - Voss Line railway begins operating.
 1887 - West Norway Museum of Decorative Art established.
 1890 - Gulating Court of Appeal established.
 1894 - Bergen Historical Society founded.
 1900 - Population: 72,179.

20th century

 1905 -  (teaching facility) established.
 1909
 Den Nationale Scene (theatre) built.
  (school) founded.
 1910
 Braille library established.
 Population: 104,224.
 1915 - Bergen Chamber of Commerce founded.
 1916 - January: Bergen fire of 1916.
 1919 - Protestant Dagen newspaper begins publication.
 1920 - Bergenshalvøens Kommunale Kraftselskap (utility) established.
 1927 - Bergensavisen newspaper in publication.
 1929 -  built.
 1930 - Chr. Michelsen Institute established.
 1933 -  built.
 1935
 Fana Gymnas (school) active.
 Asbjørn Stensaker becomes mayor.
 1936 - Norwegian School of Economics established.
 1944
 20 April: Harbour explosion in Bergen 1944.
 4 October:  near Bergen.
 Submarine "Operation Guidance" occurs in harbour.
 1945 - Nils Handal becomes mayor.
 1946
 University of Bergen established.
  (cinema) built.
 1949 -  established.
 1950 - Population: 162,381.
 1955 - Medieval Bryggen inscriptions discovered.
 1967 - Sister city relationship established with Seattle, USA.
 1970
 29 November: Body of Isdal Woman found.
 Population: 209,066.
 1972 - Arna, Åsane, Fana, and Laksevåg become part of city.
 1973
  (art school) opens.
 Eilert Eilertsen becomes mayor.
 1974 -  built.
 1975 - Bergen Bank established.
 1976 - Muslim Association of Bergen founded.
 1979
  (city archives) established.
 Bryggen designated an UNESCO World Heritage Site.
 1982 -  (radio) begins broadcasting.
 1986
 3 May: Eurovision Song Contest 1986 held.
 Electronic toll collection introduced.
 1992
 TV 2 (Norway) begins broadcasting.
 Islamic Cultural Centre established.
 1996 - Bergen National Academy of the Arts established.

21st century

 2001
  (art space) active.
 Population: 232,989.
 2002
 Hordaland Police District headquartered in Bergen.
 Bergen Program for Transport, Urban Development and the Environment begins.
 2005
 14 September: Hatlestad mudslide occurs.
 Bergen City Museum foundation established.
 2006 - 1 September: Musical group Rolling Stones perform.
 2009
 November: Gingerbread house sacked.
  slow television programme created.
 2010 - Bergen Light Rail begins operating.
 2011 -  becomes mayor.
 2015 -  held.

See also
 Bergen history
 
 List of mayors of Bergen
 
 
 
 List of years in Norway
 Timelines of other cities in Norway: Oslo

References

This article incorporates information from the Norwegian Wikipedia and Russian Wikipedia.

Bibliography
in English
 .
 
 
 
  (fulltext)

in Norwegian
 
 
 
  1895-

External links
 Europeana. Items related to Bergen, various dates
 Digital Public Library of America. Items related to Bergen, various dates.

 
Bergen
Bergen
Years in Norway